KYFB (91.5 FM) is a radio station serving the Sherman-Denison area with a conservative religious format. It is a Bible Broadcasting Network (BBN) owned-and-operated station.

External links

Bible Broadcasting Network - Station Info

YFB
Bible Broadcasting Network
Radio stations established in 2007